Hackney South was a constituency used for elections to the London County Council between 1889 and 1955.  The seat shared boundaries with the UK Parliament constituency of the same name.  The seat largely became Hackney Central, with part moved into Bethnal Green.

Councillors

Election results

References

London County Council constituencies
Politics of the London Borough of Hackney